The following is a list of the 585 communes of the Eure department of France.

The communes cooperate in the following intercommunalities (as of 2020):
CA Évreux Portes de Normandie
Communauté d'agglomération du Pays de Dreux (partly)
Communauté d'agglomération Seine-Eure
CA Seine Normandie Agglomération
Communauté de communes des 4 rivières (partly)
Communauté de communes Intercom Bernay Terres de Normandie
Communauté de communes Interco Normandie Sud Eure (partly)
Communauté de communes Lieuvin Pays d'Auge
Communauté de communes Lyons Andelle
Communauté de communes du Pays de Conches
Communauté de communes du Pays de Honfleur-Beuzeville (partly)
Communauté de communes du Pays du Neubourg
Communauté de communes de Pont-Audemer / Val de Risle
Communauté de communes Roumois Seine (partly)
Communauté de communes du Vexin Normand

References

Eure